is a Japanese manga series written and illustrated by Kaiji Kawaguchi. It was serialized in Kodansha's seinen manga magazine Morning from 2000 to 2009, with its chapters collected in forty-three tankōbon volumes. It tells the story of the members of the Japan Maritime Self-Defense Force who are transported back in time more than 60 years to 1942.

A twenty-six episode anime television series by Studio Deen and directed by Kazuhiro Furuhashi was broadcast on TBS from 2004 to 2006. It was licensed for English release in North America by Geneon Entertainment.

In 2002, Zipang won the 26th Kodansha Manga Award for the general category.

Plot
En route, they encounter a strange meteorological anomaly, causing the Mirai to lose contact with her sister ships. After a short time, the crew detects a fleet approaching, but can barely believe their eyes as a massive battleship passes by them. Two destroyers from the unknown fleet attempt to intercept the Mirai, but she manages to escape.

After examining the situation, the crew realises that the ships they passed are part of the Imperial Japanese Navy and that they have somehow been transported back in time more than 60 years to June 4/5, 1942, the first day of the Battle of Midway. Knowing that an American attack will soon devastate the four aircraft carriers of the Kido Butai, some Mirai crew members believe that they should intervene, to save the carriers and the 3,000 Japanese lives that will be lost. With the Mirais advanced technology and weaponry, which is far superior to anything possessed by the United States (or any other nation) in this era, the crew realize that they could potentially alter the course of the Second World War. However, they agree that their top priority is to return home, and to ensure that they have a home to which to return they decide to do nothing that will change history.

Despite their initial intentions not to alter history, they soon find themselves gradually drawn into the war, though they continue to refuse to choose one side over another.  The struggle of the crew from a modern, peaceful, and wealthy Japan to resist the nationalistic appeal of defending their country, knowing that in this time it is ruled by a brutal, totalitarian and militaristic government is the central theme of Zipang. Their rescue of an Imperial Japanese Navy officer from the past, Lt. Commander Kusaka, who would have perished in the normal timeline, causes unstoppable and devastating changes in the past when he seeks to create a stronger Japan no matter what the cost.

Characters
 

 Executive Officer (X.O.) and second in command aboard the Japan Maritime Self-Defense Force escort vessel JDS Mirai (DDG-182). He takes over the position of captain after Captain Umezu is injured. He always respects human life, and the action of saving Kusaka's life took priority over the implications this would have on the course of history. He felt responsibility for however history may have been changed because of Kusaka, and tried but failed to stop Kusaka's actions. Due to changes in history, Kadomatsu's father as a child was killed in a car accident, turning Kadomatsu into a man who doesn't exist, an anomaly within the alternate past. After obtaining information that Kusaka is going to Manchuria to secure oil supplies, he decides to leave Mirai and embarks on a journey to stop Kusaka. While attempting to protect Puyi, he is shot by Kusaka and seriously injured. From then on, he begins a campaign in which he utilizes military power and whatever information he possesses to save as many lives as possible that would otherwise have been lost during the war. After the New Guinea evacuation operation, he is ousted from the ship following a coup by Kikuchi. Shortly after, Kadomatsu manages to regain control of Mirai with help from Momoi and Kisaragi.

 An IJN Lt. Commander whose courier plane was shot down during the Battle of Midway and rescued by Kadomatsu. He considers the encounter with the Mirai as an opportunity to change the history for the "better" (from his perspective, at least.) He rejects both the militarism of the Japanese Empire and shame of defeat that he attributes to the postwar Japan. Instead, he seeks to create a new undefeated Japan that he calls Zipang. While he admires the humanism of Kadomatsu, he dismisses it as a luxury unsuited for wartime and is willing to shed a great deal of blood in pursuit of his ideals.

 Gunnery Officer and third in command aboard the JMSDF vessel JDS Mirai (DDG-182). Kikuchi has been best friends with Kadomatsu and Oguri ever since they were in the same batch during their time at the Japan Maritime Academy. He has a strong sense of justice and does not like taking lives. Kikuchi is usually calm in making decisions, rarely breaking out a sweat when he faces extreme situations. During early volumes of the manga, Kikuchi proposed the Mirai crew to avoid changing the past as much as possible. After events of the battle with the U.S. Navy aircraft carrier, USS Wasp, Kikuchi changes his stance on attacking enemy targets, putting the reason that Mirai is put in danger and they are doing it for self-defense. After realizing that changing the past is inevitable and viewing Kusaka's beliefs to create a stronger Japan, Kikuchi stages a mutiny aboard Mirai and takes over as captain, working alongside Kusaka to attack India. However, he is injured during Japanese army withdrawal at Tarawa lagoon island and takes refuge in Palau. At this time, Kadomatsu manages to regain control of Mirai, with Kisaragi making a deal with Kikuchi and allowing him to escape inland with Momoi. Kikuchi is last seen working with Kisaragi, preparing for the final battle to end the world war.
 

 Navigation Officer aboard the JDS Mirai (DDG-182). Oguri is best friends with Kadomatsu and Kikuchi during their time in the Maritime Academy. He is joint third in command alongside Kikuchi aboard Mirai. Oguri is the most outspoken of the three of them, but he is also impulsive when making decisions. In contrast, his personality is opposite to Kikuchi. When Kusaka was initially rescued, Oguri proposes that they should release information to him, without thinking of the consequences. He often goes into debate with Kikuchi on whether it's right to attack their own people from the past out of self-defense, or taking innocent lives even though Mirai is being attacked by enemy forces, changing the past as a result. When Kadomatsu goes after Kusaka in Manchuria, Oguri and the rest of the crew set up C4 explosives around Mirai in any case the ship is about to be captured. When Kikuchi stages his mutiny and ousts Kadomatsu as captain, Oguri is ordered by Kadomatsu to stay on board Mirai to keep an eye on Kikuchi's actions, even though he wished to leave with Kadomatsu together.

 Captain and first in command of the JDS Mirai (DDG-182). Umezu takes care of his crew and puts the safety of his men as first priority. Over the years, he is given the nickname "Hiruandon" (昼行灯), which means "one who does not stand out", by people who worked with him, as he is a modest person who does not get too much attention around himself. When Mirai was confirmed to be mysteriously brought into the past, Umezu proposes the crew not to get involved with events during the 2nd World War so as not to change history. Umezu is wise in making reasonable decisions whenever Mirai is under attack or whether the crew should join in battle with the old Japanese army. During the operation to rescue Japanese Army Defense Corps in the Aleutian Islands, Umezu is seriously injured when  light cruisers attack Mirai head on. He is later hospitalized in Yokosuka, and relinquishes his position of captain to Kadomatsu for the time being. When Umezu receives news that Kusaka is planning to build the atomic bomb, he travels to Nanjing with Kisaragi to stop him, but fails to do so and dies in his attempt.
 

 Rank of Lieutenant and medic aboard the JDS Mirai (DDG-182). Momoi is the only female crew member on the ship. She is responsible for the first aid and care of the crew on board Mirai. She is much more neutral to viewpoints and does not go into debate over changing events in history, as she holds her top priority over first aid. When Kikuchi mutinied and wrestled control over the ship from Kadomatsu, Momoi is disappointed by the crew splitting up and planned to leave with Kadomatsu just like Oguri wanted to. In the end, Kadomatsu convinced her to stay on to look after the crew's well-being. Later on Kusaka managed to capture Mirai, Momoi took care of Kikuchi when he is injured during the army withdrawal. When Kadomatsu sneaked on board with Kisaragi to retake the ship, Momoi initially refused to help when she learned of the pair's plans. However, when she learned of Kusaka's plans to build the atomic bomb and the recent death of Captain Umezu at his hands, pushed her resolve to help them take back the ship. Later, she and Kikuchi escaped together in Palau and accepted Kisaragi's offer to work together to put an end to the world war.

 Rank of Lieutenant and pilot of the MVSA-32J VTOL aircraft Umidori (Seagull) aboard the JDS Mirai (DDG-182). Satake is at times serious and sometimes fail to abide regulations. When Mirai appeared in the past just days only, Satake and his gunner, Mori, were assigned by Kadomatsu on a reconnaissance mission around Ogasawara. During the ensuing battle, Mori was killed, and Satake blames himself for making unsafe decisions. Later when Satake provides support for the Japanese army withdrawal in New Guinea, he unfortunately encountered the U.S. aviation corps. However, Satake stayed behind to defend the area from B-25 bomber planes in order to allow the Japanese army to retreat and perished in the battle.
 

 Rank of 3rd Ensign and gunner of the MVSA-32J VTOL aircraft Umidori (Seagull) aboard the JDS Mirai (DDG-182). Mori is an enthusiastic and energetic young man at age twenty. He was assigned along with Satake on a reconnaissance mission by Kadomatsu to Ogasawara. When Type 2 Floatplane fighters discovered their presence, he is killed by shots sprayed into the cockpit of the Umidori by the enemy fighters. The first crew member of Mirai to die since their arrival in the past.

Media

Manga
Written and illustrated by Kaiji Kawaguchi, Zipang was serialized in Kodansha's seinen manga magazine Weekly Morning from July 2000 to November 2009. Kodansha collected its chapters in forty-three tankōbon volumes, released from January 23, 2001, to December 22, 2009.

Anime

An anime adaptation of Zipang was produced by Studio Deen and directed by Kazuhiro Furuhashi. Tokyo Broadcasting System Television broadcast the anime series in Japan from October 7, 2004 to March 31, 2005. Since a Japan Maritime Self-Defense Force official on active service was involved in the production, some unrealistic scenes were cut from the anime version. In 2017, scholar Takayoshi Yamamura noted that anime was produced in the collaboration with the JMSDF.

At the 2006 Anime Expo, the company Geneon announced that it has licensed Zipang for distribution in North America. The first DVD was released in September of that year.

Video game
A video game version of Zipang for PlayStation 2 was released by Bandai in Japan on May 26, 2005.

Reception
Zipang won the 26th Kodansha Manga Award for general manga in 2002.

Some foreign readers and viewers were uncomfortable with the storyline. There were many arguments among the South Korean critics that the series were promoting Imperial Japan.

See also
 The Final Countdown, a 1980 American film similar in premise to Zipang.
 G.I. Samurai
 Axis of Time
 The Cockpit

References

Further reading

External links
 Zipang manga website at "Morning" 
 Zipang (the game) at the "IGN" site
 

2000 manga
2004 anime television series debuts
Alternate history anime and manga
Anime and manga about time travel
Anime series based on manga
Geneon USA
Historical anime and manga
Japanese time travel television series
Kaiji Kawaguchi
Kodansha manga
Military anime and manga
Nautical comics
Seinen manga
Studio Deen
TBS Television (Japan) original programming
Winner of Kodansha Manga Award (General)
World War II alternate histories